The following elections were held in the year 1803.

North America 

 1803 Connecticut's at-large congressional district special election
 1803 Georgia's at-large congressional district special election
 1803 United States House of Representatives elections in Kentucky
 1803 United States House of Representatives elections in Maryland
 1802–1803 United States House of Representatives elections in Massachusetts
 1803 United States House of Representatives election in New Jersey
 1803 New York's 6th congressional district special election
 1803 New York's 7th congressional district special election
 1803 United States House of Representatives elections in North Carolina
 1803 United States House of Representatives election in Ohio
 1803 United States House of Representatives elections in South Carolina
 1803 United States House of Representatives election in Tennessee
 1802–1803 United States House of Representatives elections in Vermont
 1803 United States House of Representatives elections in Virginia
 1802 and 1803 United States Senate elections

Europe

United Kingdom 

 1803 Gatton by-election

See also 

 Category:1803 elections

1803
1803-related lists
1803 elections